Wesley Andrew Reid (born 10 September 1968) is an English former professional footballer who played as a midfielder.

Career
Born in Lewisham, Reid started his career as an apprentice at Arsenal. He moved to Millwall in July 1987, and to Bradford City in January 1991. He later played in Scotland for Airdrieonians and in non-league football for Dulwich Hamlet.

References

1968 births
Living people
English footballers
Arsenal F.C. players
Millwall F.C. players
Bradford City A.F.C. players
Airdrieonians F.C. (1878) players
Dulwich Hamlet F.C. players
English Football League players
Scottish Football League players
Association football midfielders